Sawi language may refer to:
 Sawi language (Papuan), a language of West Papua, Indonesia
 Sawi language (Dardic), an Indo-Aryan language of Afghanistan

See also 
 Shawi language, spoken in South America